"On the Beach (In the Summertime)" is a song written by Landy McNeil and performed by The 5th Dimension.  It reached No. 12 on the U.S. Adult Contemporary chart, No. 29 in Canada, and No. 54 on the Billboard Hot 100 in 1970.

The song was produced by Bones Howe and arranged by Bill Holman, Bob Alcivar, and Howe.

References

1970 songs
1970 singles
The 5th Dimension songs
Bell Records singles
Song recordings produced by Bones Howe